Gopal Gupta  is an Indian philosopher and Joe Dunham Distinguished Professor of Ethics at Aurora University.
Previously, he was a professor of philosophy and religion at the University of Evansville. Gupta is the editor-in-chief of the Journal of Hindu-Christian Studies (JHCS).

Books
 Māyā in the Bhāgavata Purāna: Human Suffering and Divine Play, Oxford University Press 2020

References

21st-century American philosophers
Philosophy academics
University of Evansville faculty
Aurora University faculty
Living people

Year of birth missing (living people)